Janet Kirkland Starr was an American Democratic politician from Belmont, Massachusetts. She represented the 23rd Middlesex district in the Massachusetts House of Representatives from 1963 to 1968.

References

Year of birth missing
Year of death missing
Members of the Massachusetts House of Representatives
Women state legislators in Massachusetts
20th-century American women politicians
People from Belmont, Massachusetts
20th-century American politicians